Scaligeria is a genus of flowering plants belonging to the family Apiaceae. It is also in Tribe Pyramidoptereae.

Its native range is eastern Mediterranean (within Crete, Cyprus, East Aegean Islands, Greece and Yugoslavia) to Central Asia (within Albania, Lebanon, Libya, Palestine, Syria and Turkey) and Uzbekistan.  

The genus name of Scaligeria is in honour of Julius Caesar Scaliger (1484–1558), an Italian scholar and physician, who spent a major part of his career in France. 
It was first described and published in Coll. Mém. Vol.5 on page 70 in 1829.

Known species
According to Kew:
Scaligeria alziarii 
Scaligeria halophila 
Scaligeria korshinskii 
Scaligeria lazica 
Scaligeria moreana 
Scaligeria napiformis

References

Apioideae
Apioideae genera